Manea Mănescu (9 August 1916 – 27 February 2009) was a Romanian communist politician who served as Prime Minister for five years (27 February 1974 – 29 March 1979) during Nicolae Ceaușescu's Communist regime.

His father was a Communist Party veteran from Ploiești, who in the early 1920s supported the transformation of the Socialist Party into the Romanian Communist Party (PCR). Mănescu joined the PCR in 1938, while he was a student at the Academy of Economic Studies in Bucharest. In 1944, after King Michael's Coup, he worked together with Nicolae Ceaușescu, his future brother-in-law, in the Union of Communist Youth. In 1951, Mănescu was appointed as head of the Department of Economics at the University of Bucharest and Director General of the Central Directorate of Statistics. He served as Finance Minister from 1955 until 1957.

In December 1967 he was appointed Chairman of the Economic Council. He was promoted to full membership of the Executive Committee of the PCR in December 1968 and, after holding various positions in the party and government, he became Prime Minister in March 1974, a position he held until 1979, when he retired, reportedly due to ill health. 
Also in 1974 he became titular member of the Romanian Academy.

Mănescu stayed close to Ceaușescu and his wife, Elena Ceaușescu up until the  Romanian Revolution of 1989. He left the Central Committee's building by helicopter together with them on 22 December, though he had to disembark at Snagov due to too much weight in the craft. He was arrested shortly afterward and taken to the airbase at Deveselu, where he was kept in detention until 31 December. Tried in early 1990 together with Emil Bobu, Ion Dincă, and Tudor Postelnicu, Mănescu was sentenced to life in prison for participation in genocide; on appeal, his sentence was reduced to 10 years. He served two years in prison, and was set free on 12 November 1992 due to poor health. Because of his conviction, he was stripped of his membership in the Romanian Academy.

He died in 2009, aged 92, and was buried at Bellu Cemetery in Bucharest.

Family
Mănescu's wife, Maria Munteanu Mănescu, was a well known pediatrician. In December 1973, she was named Vice Chairman of the Romanian Red Cross Society. She was also named a member of the (Romanian) National Council of Women in April 1978. It is not clear if the Mănescus had any children.

References

External links

1916 births
2009 deaths
Politicians from Brăila
People of the Romanian Revolution
Prime Ministers of Romania
Deputy Prime Ministers of Romania
State Council of Romania
Romanian Ministers of Finance
Romanian communists
Romanian politicians convicted of crimes
Bucharest Academy of Economic Studies alumni
Academic staff of the University of Bucharest
Academic staff of the Bucharest Academy of Economic Studies
Burials at Bellu Cemetery
Prisoners and detainees of Romania
Prisoners sentenced to life imprisonment by Romania